Martínez Nadal is a rapid transit station in San Juan agglomeration, Puerto Rico. It is located between Torrimar and Las Lomas stations on the sole line of the Tren Urbano system, in the Monacillo Urbano district of the city of San Juan close to the municipal border with Guaynabo. The station is named after the PR-20 highway located nearby, itself named after politician Rafael Martínez Nadal. The trial service ran in 2004, however, the regular service only started on 6 June 2005.

Nearby 
 Altamira neighborhood 
 San Patricio Plaza (further north on PR-20)

References

Tren Urbano stations
Railway stations in the United States opened in 2004
2004 establishments in Puerto Rico